Sprongeggi or Sprongdalseggi is a mountain on the border of Skjåk Municipality in Innlandet county and Luster Municipality in Vestland county, Norway. The mountain is surrounded by several other notable mountains including Syrtbyttnosi to the east, Rivenoskulen to the southeast, Greineggi to the south, and Tverreggi to the north. The lake Styggevatnet lies immediately northwest of the lake.

See also
List of mountains of Norway

References

Skjåk
Luster, Norway
Mountains of Innlandet
Mountains of Vestland